Dhirendra Brahmachari (12 February 1924 – 9 June 1994), born Dhirendra Choudhary in village Basaith Chanpura, Madhubani, Bihar, was a yoga teacher of Yogi Bhajan who taught Kundalini Yoga in the West and founded 3HO. Dhirendra Brahmachari was also yoga mentor of Indira Gandhi –The former prime minister of India He ran ashrams in Bhondsi (Gurugram in Delhi NCR), Jammu, Katra and Mantalai (near Sudhmahadev in Udhampur district of Jammu and Kashmir) and wrote books on yoga.

Biography
He was born in a brahmin family He later got Inspired by reading the Bhagavad Gita, he left home at the age of thirteen and went to Varanasi. His guru was Maharshi Kartikeya whose ashram was at Gopal-Khera, about twelve miles from Lucknow. Dhirendra Brahmachari studied yoga and associated subjects there. In the 1960s he was invited to travel to the U.S.S.R. as a hatha yoga expert to train Soviet cosmonauts. Jawaharlal Nehru later invited him to teach yoga to his daughter, Indira Gandhi, to improve her health.  He is said to have guided Mrs. Gandhi's vision and ideas. He became influential politically in 1975–77 when Mrs Gandhi dissolved Parliament, declared a state of emergency and suspended civil liberties.

In the late 1970s, Dhirendra Brahmachari promoted the benefits of yoga in a weekly program called "Yogabhyaas" which was broadcast on Doordarshan, the state-owned television network. He introduced yoga as a subject of study in Delhi administered schools, a considerable innovation.

He was the owner of Vishwayatan Yogashram in the centre of Delhi, now known as the Morarji Desai National Institute of Yoga. He also owned campuses in Jammu, Katra and Mantalai, plots of land he had received through his Indira Gandhi clout. Known as "the Flying Swami", he not only helped her form decisions and make appointments, but he also executed some of her orders.

He wrote books on yoga in Hindi and English including 'Yogic Sukshma Vyayama' and 'Yogasana Vijnana'. 
His ashram at Mantalai is spread over 1008 kanals of land with private airstrips, hangar, a zoo and a seven storey building in gandhi nagar, Jammu.

Nowadays there are three known successors of Dhirendra Brahmachari yoga tradition: Bal Mukund Singh from India, Reinhard Gammenthaler from Switzerland and Rainer Neyer from Austria.

Criminal charges
Mr. Brahmachari was charged with buying an aircraft in the United States during the Emergency imposed by Mrs Gandhi and smuggling it into the country without paying customs duties, but he was never tried. Dozens of other criminal cases were filed against him and many dragged on till his death. In one case, he was accused of illegally importing gun parts from Spain for his factory, which had a licence to make guns only with local materials.

Death
Dhirendra Brahmachari died in a plane crash, along with his pilot, when they hit a pine tree on June 9, 1994, while landing at his religious retreat and yoga school in Mantalai.

References

http://www.eng.vedanta.ru/library/brodov/Vasily_Brodov_Russian_Philosopher_and_Yoga_Practitioner.php

External links 
 Sukshma Vyayam (A better way to health), film by N.S. Thapa, Films Division of the Indian Government, 1950 - a film about yoga exercises featuring Dhirendra Brahmachari
 nytimes.com

1924 births
1994 deaths
Indian yoga teachers
People from Madhubani, India
Victims of aviation accidents or incidents in India